Blackwater and Hawley is a civil parish in the Hart district of Hampshire, England, on the border with Surrey.  According to the 2001 census it had a population of 5,849, reducing to 4,473 at the 2011 Census.  The parish includes Minley, Blackwater and Hawley, which are both part of the Aldershot Urban Area. It was once part of the parish of Yateley.

References

External links

Villages in Hampshire